The Ghaznavi (Urdu:غزنوی; official codename: Hatf–III Ghaznavi), is a hypersonic Surface to surface short range ballistic missile designed and developed by the National Development Complex, with the first version in service with the Pakistan Army's strategic command since 2004. With an optimal range of 290 km, it is named after the 11th century Muslim Turkic leader Mahmud of Ghazni. The word Hatf means deadly or vengeance in Arabic. It entered service with the Pakistan Army in 2012 after a successful launch conducted by ASFC (Army Strategic Command Force) on May 10, 2012.

The Hatf-III is a "Scud" type ballistic missile. The missile could carry nuclear and conventional warheads to a range of 290 km. It was the second nuclear-capable missile test-fired by the Pakistan army in less than two weeks, since India's launch of Agni-V.

The missile has a length of 9.64m, diameter of 0.99 m, launch weight of 5256 kg and is powered by a single stage solid fuel rocket motor. It is believed influenced from a Chinese design, the M-11 (NATO reporting name: CSS-7).

Design history
Initially, the Pakistan government was actively pushing for acquiring the M-11 missiles from China with the intention of a quick deployment. Prime Minister Benazir Bhutto personally lobbied in China for the M-11 missiles, but was unable to do so due to intense pressure mounted by the United States and the MTCR's strict monitoring of prevention of the technology transfers of the missiles. Development on Ghaznavi started in 1990s after the refusal of export of M-11 missiles from China to Pakistan. The Ghaznavi was pursued alongside the Abdali program, and its features are extremely close to those of the Chinese M-11. The Ghaznavi program contract was awarded to NDC.

The Pakistan military officials consistently maintained that the Ghaznavi program is locally designed and indigenously built. In 1995, its engine was successfully tested and was said to be a "major break-through in missile development in Pakistan".

Tests and status
The Ghaznavi took its first spaceflight on 26 May 2002, at the height of the military standoff between India and Pakistan. On 3 October 2003, the Ghaznavi was again successfully test fired from an undisclosed location, which was described by the military as "highly successful". The Ghaznavi successfully reached its target and has a range of 290km (180mi), making it capable of striking several key targets within neighboring nuclear rival, India. The Ghaznavi entered in the service in March 2004 and currently with the Pakistan Army.

Its third test launched took place on 8 December 2004; subsequent tests were conducted on 9 December 2006 another on 13 February 2008 and 8 May 2010; the 2008 test was believed to have concluded a winter training exercise of Pakistan's Army Strategic Force Command (ASFC). In May 2012, one more successful test of the missile was conducted as part of a training exercise.

Pakistan successfully carried out night training launch of Ghaznavi missile on August 28, 2019. 

During its development at the NDC, the program was named in the memory of Mahmud of Ghazni– the 10th century Turkic emperor who founded the Ghaznavid Empire and frequently invaded India. The JS HQ, however, officially codenames the missile as "Hatf–III Ghaznavi".

References

External links
 CSIS Missile Threat - Hatf 3

Short-range ballistic missiles of Pakistan
Military equipment introduced in the 2000s